Steven Greenhouse is an American labor and workplace journalist and writer. He covered labor for The New York Times for 31 years until he left the newspaper in 2014. On December 2, 2014, he announced on Twitter: "Thanks All. With great ambivalence, I'm taking NYT buyout. I plan to write a book & still write lots of articles on labor & other matters". He has contributed as an occasional op-ed writer to The New York Times since February 2015.

He graduated from Wesleyan University, the Columbia University Graduate School of Journalism, and the New York University School of Law. He lives in New York City. His daughter is Emily Greenhouse, the editor of The New York Review of Books.

Awards
2010 Society of Professional Journalists Deadline Club Award: Beat reporting for newspapers and wire services, for "World of Hurt" with N.R. Kleinfield
2010 New York Press Club Award: Outstanding enterprise or investigative reporting, for "World of Hurt" with N.R. Kleinfield
2009 The Hillman Prize for The Big Squeeze: Tough Times for the American Worker
2014 Gerald Loeb Award for Breaking News for "Bangladesh"

Works
"Janesville, Wisconsin", Granta, January 2010
"The End of Summer Vacation", Slate, June 11, 2008
"The Unpaid Intern, Legal or Not", The New York Times, April 2, 2010
The Big Squeeze: Tough Times for the American Worker, Random House, Inc., 2009, 
The rights of teachers: the basic ACLU guide to a teacher's constitutional rights, Bantam Books, 1984, 
"Refusal to Fire Unattractive Saleswoman led to Dismissal, Suit Contends", Race, class, and gender in the United States: an integrated study, Macmillan, 2006, 
"Child Care the Perk of Tomorrow", A nation at work: the Heldrich guide to the American workforce, Editors Herbert A. Schaffner, Carl E. Van Horn, Rutgers University Press, 2003, 
Beaten Down, Worked Up: The Past, Present, and Future of American Labor Steven Greenhouse. Knopf, 2019 (416p)

References

External links
New York Times Caucus blog
New York Times Economix blog
"The Big Squeeze", AFL-CIO
"Steven Greenhouse", WNYC

American male journalists
Wesleyan University alumni
Columbia Graduate School of Architecture, Planning and Preservation alumni
New York University School of Law alumni
Living people
Year of birth missing (living people)
Gerald Loeb Award winners for Breaking News